Hexahydroxynaphthoquinone can be any of several organic compounds, including:
Hexahydroxy-1,4-naphthalenedione (spinochrome E)
Hexahydroxy-1,2-naphthalenedione
Hexahydroxy-2,3-naphthalenedione
Hexahydroxy-2,6-naphthalenedione

Polyols
Hydroxynaphthoquinones